Halfwidth and Fullwidth Forms is the name of a Unicode block U+FF00–FFEF, provided so that older encodings containing both halfwidth and fullwidth characters can have lossless translation to/from Unicode. It is the second-to-last block of the Basic Multilingual Plane, followed only by the short Specials block at U+FFF0–FFFF. Its block name in Unicode 1.0 was Halfwidth and Fullwidth Variants.

Range U+FF01–FF5E reproduces the characters of ASCII 21 to 7E as fullwidth forms. U+FF00 does not correspond to a fullwidth ASCII 20 (space character), since that role is already fulfilled by U+3000 "ideographic space".

Range U+FF61–FF9F encodes halfwidth forms of katakana and related punctuation in a transposition of A1 to DF in the JIS X 0201 encoding – see half-width kana.

The range U+FFA0–FFDC encodes halfwidth forms of compatibility jamo characters for Hangul, in a transposition of their 1974 standard layout. It is used in the mapping of some IBM encodings for Korean, such as IBM code page 933, which allows the use of the Shift Out and Shift In characters to shift to a double-byte character set. Since the double-byte character set could contain compatibility jamo, halfwidth variants are needed to provide round-trip compatibility.

Range U+FFE0–FFEE includes fullwidth and halfwidth symbols.

Block

The block has variation sequences defined for East Asian punctuation positional variants.

An additional variant is defined for a fullwidth zero with a short diagonal stroke: U+FF10 FULLWIDTH DIGIT ZERO, U+FE00 VS1 (０︀).

History
The following Unicode-related documents record the purpose and process of defining specific characters in the Halfwidth and Fullwidth Forms block:

See also 

 CJK Symbols and Punctuation (Unicode block)
 Hangul Jamo (Unicode block)
 Katakana (Unicode block)
 Latin script in Unicode
 Enclosed Alphanumerics - bullet point sequences, some appear as full width (e.g. ⒈,⓵,⑴,⒜,ⓐ)

References

Unicode blocks
Latin-script Unicode blocks
Kana
Halfwidth